The Israel Defense Prize (Hebrew: פרס בטחון ישראל), also known as the Israel Defense Award is an award presented annually by the President of Israel to people and organizations who made significant contributions to the defense of the State of Israel.

The prize was first awarded in 1958 and it is awarded each year by the President of Israel.

References

Awards established in 1958
Israeli awards
 
1958 establishments in Israel